Atractus bocki, Bock's ground snake, is a species of snake in the family Colubridae. The species can be found from Bolivia to Argentina.

References 

Atractus
Reptiles of Bolivia
Reptiles of Argentina
Snakes of South America
Reptiles described in 1909
Taxa named by Franz Werner